Mildred B. Davis is an American novelist whose books generally fall into the suspense/mystery genre.
Katherine (Davis) Roome, her daughter, and a published author herself, helped Mildred break a 30-year publishing silence by working with her to turn some previously unpublished manuscripts into the Murder in Maine series.  The third book of this series, however, was written by Mildred quite recently.

Works
1948 - The Room Upstairs (Edgar Award for Best First Novel, presented by the Mystery Writers of America)
1953 - They Buried a Man
1954 - Suicide Hour (a Novella)
1955 - The Dark Place
1964 - The Voice on the Telephone
1966 - The Sound of Insects
1967 - Strange Corner
1967 - Walk Into Yesterday (aka Nightmare of Murder) 
1969 - The Third Half
1971 - Three Minutes to Midnight
1974 - The Invisible Boarder
1975 - Tell Them What's-Her-Name Called
1977 - Scorpion
1977 - Lucifer Land (with Katherine Davis) (Katherine is the primary author. This is an historical drama based on an actual diary.)
2006 - Murder in Maine: The Avenging of Nevah Wright (with Katherine Roome)
2007 - Murder in Maine: The Fly Man Murders (with Katherine Roome)
2008 - Murder in Maine: The Butterfly Effect (with Katherine Roome) (sequel to Murder in Maine: The Avenging of Nevah Wright)

External links
 The Mildred Davis Mystery Bookroom This site was created by Richard Aylesworth, with Mildred's blessing, though without her input.  The site offers a free download of the novella Suicide Hour (1954), not now available anywhere else.
 Murder in Maine  You may purchase the Murder in Maine books here, and they will help you find used copies of the older books.

Year of birth missing (living people)
Living people
American mystery novelists
20th-century American novelists
Edgar Award winners
21st-century American novelists
American women novelists
20th-century American women writers
21st-century American women writers
Women mystery writers